Hard to Handle (1933) is a pre-Code comedy film starring James Cagney as a breezily clowning con artist who organizes a Depression-era dance marathon. His character remarks at one point, "The mass is a cow. It must be milked". The movie was produced at Warner Bros. and directed by Mervyn LeRoy.

Cast
James Cagney as Myron C. 'Lefty' Merrill
Mary Brian as Ruth Waters
Allen Jenkins as Marathon radio announcer
Ruth Donnelly as Lil Waters
Claire Dodd as Marlene Reeves
Robert McWade as Charles G. Reeves
 Berton Churchill as Col. H.D.X. Wells 
 Emma Dunn as 	Mrs. Hawks 
 Gavin Gordon as 	John Hayden 
 Sterling Holloway as Andy Heaney 
 William H. Strauss as 	Mr. Abe Goldstein 
 Bess Flowers as 	Merrill's Secretary

External links
 
 

1933 films
1933 comedy films
American black-and-white films
American comedy films
1930s English-language films
Films about con artists
Films directed by Mervyn LeRoy
Warner Bros. films
1930s American films